Alino Island is the predominantly ice-covered island in Biscoe Islands, Antarctica lying  south-southeast of Tula Point, Renaud Island.

The island is named after the settlement of Alino in Western Bulgaria.

Location
British mapping in 1971.

Maps
 British Antarctic Territory: Graham Coast.  Scale 1:200000 topographic map.  DOS 610 Series, Sheet W 65 64.  Directorate of Overseas Surveys, UK, 1971.
 Antarctic Digital Database (ADD). Scale 1:250000 topographic map of Antarctica. Scientific Committee on Antarctic Research (SCAR). Since 1993, regularly upgraded and updated.

References

 Bulgarian Antarctic Gazetteer. Antarctic Place-names Commission. (details in Bulgarian, basic data in English)
 Alino Island. SCAR Composite Antarctic Gazetteer.

External links
 Alino Island. Copernix satellite image

Islands of the Biscoe Islands
Bulgaria and the Antarctic